The Discourse on Voluntary Servitude is an essay by Étienne de La Boétie. The text was published clandestinely in 1577.

The date of preparation of the Discourse on Voluntary Servitude is uncertain: according to recent studies it was composed by Étienne de La Boétie during his university education. According to his closest friend Michel de Montaigne, the speech was written when La Boétie was about 18 years old.

Content
The essay argues that any tyrant remains in power while his subjects grant him that, therefore delegitimizing every form of power. The original freedom of men would be indeed abandoned by society which, once corrupted by the habit, would have preferred the servitude of the courtier to the freedom of the free man, who refuses to be submissive and to obey.

Bibliography 
 Œuvres complètes, Editions William Blake & Co., 1991. 
 Discours de la servitude volontaire, Editions Mille et une nuits, 1997. 
 Discours de la servitude volontaire, Editions Flammarion, 1993. 
 The Politics of Obedience: The Discourse of Voluntary Servitude, translated by Harry Kurz and with an introduction by Murray Rothbard, Montrèal/New York/London: Black Rose Books, 1997. 
 The Politics of Obedience: The Discourse of Voluntary Servitude, translated by Harry Kurz and with an introduction by Murray Rothbard, Free Life Editions, 1975.

References

Further reading 
 Keohane, Nannerl O. (1977). ‘The Radical Humanism of Étienne de la Boétie’, Journal of the History of Ideas. 38:119–130.
 Lablénie, Edmond (1930). ‘L’Énigme de la “Servitude Volontaire”’, Revue du seizième siècle. 17:203–227 [French].
 Podoksik, Efraim (2003). ‘Estienne de La Boëtie and the Politics of Obedience’, Bibliothèque d’Humanisme et Renaissance. LXV(1): 83–95.
 
 Rothbard, Murray. 'Ending Tyranny Without Violence', originally titled The Political Thought of Étienne de La Boétie

External links

 

1576 books
Essay collections
French non-fiction books
Philosophy books
Philosophy essays